The Kampala Cement Company Limited (KCCL) is a manufacturer of cement in Uganda.

Location
The facility sits on the eastern bank of the Sezibwa River at coordinates: 0°23'11.0"N, 32°51'13.0"E (Latitude:0°23'11.0"N; Longitude:32°51'13.0"E).

Ownership
KCCL is a wholly owned subsidiary of Multiple Industries Limited, an industrial conglomerate involved in the manufacture and marketing of building materials, including metal bars, plumbing pipes, rainwater gutters, plastic pipes, and cement.

See also
 List of cement manufacturers in Uganda
 List of companies and cities in Africa that manufacture cement

References

External links
National Cement to build Sh18.5bn plant in Uganda
 Kampala Cement

Manufacturing companies established in 2015
2015 establishments in Uganda
Mukono District
Cement companies of Uganda